Ivan Matthew Henry Vodanovich  (8 April 1930 – 2 September 1995) was a New Zealand rugby union player, coach and administrator. He played three tests for the All Blacks in 1955. Vodanovich was All Blacks coach from 1969 to 1971.

As then coach and chief selector of the New Zealand team, he gained some notoriety for warning that the first test of the British Lions 1971 tour of New Zealand could be "another Passchendaele" for the Lions if they continued to play negative rugby as they had in a preliminary match against Canterbury.  The Lions went on to record a rare series win 2–1.

In the 1992 Queen's Birthday Honours, Vodanovich was appointed a Member of the Order of the British Empire, for services to rugby.

References

1930 births
1995 deaths
New Zealand international rugby union players
New Zealand national rugby union team coaches
New Zealand Members of the Order of the British Empire
New Zealand people of Croatian descent
Rugby union props